Edward Tufnell may refer to:
 Edward Tufnell (bishop), Anglican bishop of Brisbane, Queensland, Australia
 Edward Tufnell (politician), British Army officer and politician
 Edward Carleton Tufnell, English civil servant and educationist